Bidak may refer to:

 Bidak, Afghanistan
 Bidak, Arunachal Pradesh, India
 Bidak, Abadeh, Fars Province, Iran
 Bidak, Fasa, Fars Province, Iran
 Bidak-e Olya, Kohgiluyeh and Boyer-Ahmad Province, Iran
 Bidak-e Salar, Kohgiluyeh and Boyer-Ahmad Province, Iran
 Bidak-e Sohrab, Kohgiluyeh and Boyer-Ahmad Province, Iran
 Bidak, Bojnord, North Khorasan Province, Iran
 Bidak, Jajrom, North Khorasan Province, Iran
 Bidak, Mashhad, Razavi Khorasan Province, Iran
 Bidak, Sabzevar, Razavi Khorasan Province, Iran
 Bidak, Taybad, Razavi Khorasan Province, Iran
 Bidak, Torbat-e Jam, Razavi Khorasan Province, Iran
 Bidak-e Bala, Khash County, Sistan and Baluchestan Province, Iran
 Bidak-e Pain, Khash County, Sistan and Baluchestan Province, Iran
 Bidak, Shusef, South Khorasan Province, Iran
 Bidak-e Yekan, South Khorasan Province, Iran
 Bidak, Tehran, Iran
 Bidak Rural District, in Fars Province, Iran